The 2010 William Hill Greyhound Derby Final took place during April and May with the final being held on 29 May 2010 at Wimbledon Stadium. The competition was sponsored by William Hill following the end of the sponsorship deal with Blue Square. The winner Bandicoot Tipoki received £75,000.

The event was still over 480 metres, but Wimbledon had switched the grandstand to the other side of the track creating a different course. Six rounds were to take place and the final saw the field finish within two lengths of each other. One greyhound, Lyreen Mover, kennelled at Tony Magnasco's in Oxfordshire, reached the final unbeaten under Hungarian trainer Gabor Tenczel. This was the first time an entry had been received from outside the UK or Ireland.

Bandicoot Tipoki moved wide at the start and impeded Krug Ninety Five. There was a battle at the front between Lyreen Mover and Toomaline Jack which lasted all the way to the line. Tipoki, however, finished well and claimed victory near the line. Charlie Lister won his fifth greyhound Derby and equalled the post-war record of five wins by Leslie Reynolds.

Final result 
At Wimbledon (over 480 metres):

Distances 
½, short head, short head, short head, ¾ (lengths)
The distances between the greyhounds are in finishing order and shown in lengths. One length is equal to 0.08 of one second.

Quarter finals

Semi finals

Competition report
The number of entries increased by 69 on the previous year resulting in 215 greyhounds lining up for the event. The ante post favourite at 7-1 was Eye Onthe Storm trained by Mark Wallis; the black and white dog had won the Eclipse, Puppy Classic and Blue Riband.

The new course duly created a series of new tracks records on the first night, (Eye Eye Pickle (28.48) was followed by Aero Ardiles (28.38) and Bandicott Tipoki (28.26), the first night however was ruined by the serious injury and elimination of Eye Onthe Storm. Fear Zafonic and Barefoot Bullet stood out during the remaining qualifiers. Bandocoot Tipoki went fastest again during the second round recording 28.35 and there were good wins for Juvenile champion Ten Large Down and Toomaline Jack but Fear Zafonic crashed out.

The third round caused a surprise when both Ten Large Down and Scottish Greyhound Derby champion Nambisco were eliminated, overseas entry Lyreen Mover remained unbeaten as did Mesedo Blue, Toomaline Jack and favourite Bandicoot Tipoki. The first quarter final went to Westmead Scolari, a heat that saw Mesedo Blue go out and this was followed by a win for Romeo Reason and elimination of Barefoot Bullet. Tommaline Jack impressed in the third heat recording a fast 28.37 and the round ended with Lyreen Mover defeating Bandicoot Tipoki by a neck. It was clear at this stage that Lyreen Mover would be hard to break clear off.

The first semi final went once again to Lyreen Mover by just a head with Oran Classic and Krug Ninety Five sealing places for Ireland in the final. The two favourites Toomaline Jack and Bandicoot Tipoki claimed the first and second place in heat two with Adageo grabbing the final spot.

See also
2010 UK & Ireland Greyhound Racing Year

References

External links
Greyhound Board of Great Britain
Greyhound Data

English Greyhound Derby
Greyhound Derby
English Greyhound Derby
English Greyhound Derby
English Greyhound Derby
English Greyhound Derby